Eha Pärn (born in 1957) is an Estonian municipal politician and civil servant.

2004–2005, she was County Governor of Tartu County.

In 2006, she was granted the Order of the White Star, IV Class.

References

Living people
1957 births
20th-century Estonian politicians
21st-century Estonian politicians
20th-century Estonian women politicians
21st-century Estonian women politicians
Estonian civil servants
Recipients of the Order of the White Star, 4th Class